Indian Springs Park may refer to:

Indian Springs State Park, located near Jackson and Flovilla, Georgia
Indian Springs Park (Davenport, Iowa)
Manatee Mineral Springs Park, formally known as Indian Springs Park, located in Bradenton, Florida